There are a number of high-profile independent social movements in South Africa.  The majority have a particular focus on the housing crisis in the urban areas but others range from focusing on HIV/AIDS, working conditions, unemployment, access to service delivery and issues of democracy, transparency and accountability, corruption, poverty, crime, xenophobia, economy, drought, racism, sexism, health conditions etc...

This is a partial list of social movements in South Africa:

 Abahlali baseMjondolo, the shackdwellers movement based in KwaZulu-Natal and the Western Cape
 Equal Education based in the Western Cape and Gauteng
 InkuluFreeHeid, based in Gauteng with chapters elsewhere in the country.
 The Landless People's Movement, based in Gauteng
 The Mandela Park Backyarders based in the Western Cape
 The Poor People's Alliance, a national alliance of grassroots movements
 SANARA, the South African National Resistance Army, a 'defend democracy' organization
 Reclaim The City, a social movement fighting for land and housing in Cape Town's inner-city and wealthy suburbs
 Sikhula Sonke women's farmworkers union based in the Western Cape
 The Social Justice Coalition based in the Western Cape
 The South African Unemployed Peoples' Movement based in Durban, KZN and in Grahamstown in the Eastern Cape
 The Treatment Action Campaign, based in the Western Cape but with branches elsewhere in the country
 The Western Cape Anti-Eviction Campaign, based in the Western Cape

 
Sociology lists